Elaine Kinsella (born 24 November 1981) is an Irish broadcaster. She was born in Wexford but grew up in Listowel, County Kerry.

Together with Andrew Morrissey, Elaine presents the breakfast show Kerry's Full Breakfast on weekday mornings between 7 and 9am on Radio Kerry.

Elaine studied Communications in the Dublin Institute of Technology. As a student she wrote and directed a short film Ding Dong Hamlet is Dead which starred Irish actors Cillian Murphy and Nuala O'Neill.

Elaine worked as digital compositor on the BAFTA Award-winning animated film Sir Gawain and the Green Knight (Moving Still Productions, 2002).

In 2007, Elaine and Brian Hurley won the PPI Award for Best Radio Drama for From Heartache to Hope - The Story of the Jeanie Johnston. Elaine Kinsella wrote the original script.

In 2009, Elaine's second radio play 1923 premiered on Radio Kerry. The project was funded by the BCI's Sound & Vision scheme.  It was nominated in the Best Drama category at the 2009 PPI Radio Awards.

Elaine is a regular panellist on RTE's Today show. In April 2021 she guest presented the show with Daithi O Sé.

References

1981 births
20th-century Irish people
21st-century Irish dramatists and playwrights
Living people
Irish women dramatists and playwrights
Irish film directors
Irish women film directors
Irish women radio presenters
Radio Kerry presenters
People from County Kerry
People from County Wexford
Alumni of Dublin Institute of Technology
Irish radio writers
Women radio writers
21st-century Irish women writers